Bai Kelfa Sankoh is a Sierra Leonean paramount chief representing Kambia District, one of the five districts that make up the Northern Province. He is a member of the Loko ethnic group.
He is one of the greatest paramount chiefs in Sierra Leone, and he is the only paramount chief that went to war with the Nigerian soldiers to fight the rebels during ten-year war in the country.

External links
https://web.archive.org/web/20071022093714/http://slpp.ws/browse.asp?page=426

Year of birth missing (living people)
Living people
Sierra Leonean politicians
Loko people
Place of birth missing (living people)